A Townend ring is a narrow-chord cowling ring fitted around the cylinders of an aircraft radial engine to reduce drag and improve cooling.

Development
The Townend ring was the invention of Dr. Hubert Townend of the British National Physical Laboratory in 1929. Patents were supported by Boulton & Paul Ltd in 1929. In the United States it was often called a "drag ring". It caused a reduction in the drag of radial engines and was widely used in high-speed designs of 1930–1935, before the long-chord NACA cowling came into general use. Despite suggestions of it exploiting the Meredith effect, low airspeeds, low temperature differences and small mass flows make that unlikely, particularly when combined with the lack of flow control as the air exits the cowling.
Although superior to earlier cowlings, and uncowled engines in terms of drag and cooling, above  the NACA cowling was more efficient and soon replaced it in general use.

Examples of aircraft with Townend rings include the Boeing P-26 Peashooter, the Vickers Wellesley, the Fokker D.XVI and the central engine on the Junkers Ju 52/3m.

Notes

References

External links

 The Spotters Glossary
 
 
 

Aircraft propulsion components